The WWE European Championship was a professional wrestling championship competed for in World Wrestling Entertainment. During the late 1990s and early 2000s, multiple wrestlers held the European and WWF Intercontinental Championships within short spans of each other, and four held both simultaneously, becoming "Eurocontinental champions".

Established in 1997 as the "WWF European Championship", the title incurred a brief hiatus in 1999 due to then-champion Shane McMahon's desire to retire as an "undefeated champion". It was renamed in May 2002 when the WWF became the WWE before finally being unified with the WWE Intercontinental Championship in July that year. Despite its name, only two holders were actually from Europe: the British Bulldog, who was the inaugural and longest-reigning champion, and William Regal. It became a prominent singles title of the Attitude Era, held by then-former world champions Shawn Michaels and Diamond Dallas Page, along with Triple H, Kurt Angle, Chris Jericho, and Eddie Guerrero, among others.

History
In 1997, the British Bulldog was crowned the first WWF European Champion by winning a tournament that was held over several shows in Germany, culminating in a finals victory over Owen Hart. Upon winning the title, Shawn Michaels became the first Grand Slam Champion in WWE. Michaels is the only wrestler to have held both the WWF World Heavyweight Championship and the European title at the same time.

After winning the European title, both D'Lo Brown and Al Snow were billed from different parts of Europe each week while champion. During Snow's reign, he and "Head" dressed up as various ethnic stereotypes corresponding to the European location they were billed from, though not always in a politically or geographically correct manner. The title was retired briefly in April 1999 by then-champion Shane McMahon, who wanted to retire as an "undefeated champion". McMahon reintroduced the championship two months later and gave it to Mideon, who saw the title belt in Shane's travel bag and asked if he could have it.

Inaugural tournament

Eurocontinental Champions and unification
The term "Eurocontinenental Champion" is a portmanteau of European and Intercontinental, used to describe wrestlers who held both titles simultaneously. Three wrestlers accomplished this feat. The first was D'Lo Brown, who defeated Mideon for the European title at Fully Loaded in 1999 and two nights later at a Monday Night Raw taping, defeated Jeff Jarrett to win the Intercontinental Championship. A month later at SummerSlam Jarrett defeated Brown to win both titles but awarded the European Championship to Mark Henry the following day.

On the February 10, 2000 edition of SmackDown! Kurt Angle defeated Val Venis for the European Championship. Seventeen days later, at No Way Out, Angle defeated Chris Jericho for the Intercontinental Championship and became the third Eurocontinental Champion. Angle held the titles until WrestleMania 2000, when he faced Jericho and Chris Benoit in a three-way dance for both titles. In a rarity, Angle lost both of his championships without being pinned or forced to submit; Benoit defeated Jericho in the first fall for the Intercontinental Championship and Jericho defeated Benoit in the second fall to take the European Championship.

In May 2002, the WWF was renamed to WWE and the title was renamed accordingly, though the physical belt was not updated to reflect the name change. The title was then unified with the WWE Intercontinental Championship in a ladder match on the July 22, 2002 episode of Raw, when Intercontinental Champion Rob Van Dam defeated European Champion Jeff Hardy.

Reigns

The British Bulldog was the inaugural champion, and had the longest title reign at 206 days. William Regal and D'Lo Brown both had the most title reigns, each holding it four times. Jeff Hardy was the youngest champion at 24, while Diamond Dallas Page was the oldest champion at 46. Jeff Hardy was the final champion.  The title was retired on the July 22, 2002 episode of Monday Night Raw when WWE Intercontinental Champion Rob Van Dam defeated European Champion Jeff Hardy in a ladder match to unify the European title into the Intercontinental title.

Other media
The title appears in the video games WWF No Mercy, WWF SmackDown! 2: Know Your Role, WWF SmackDown! Just Bring It, WWE WrestleMania X8, WWE SmackDown! Shut Your Mouth, WWE '12, WWE '13, WWE 2K14, WWE 2K15, WWE 2K16, WWE 2K17, WWE 2K18,  WWE 2K19, WWE 2K20 and WWE 2K22.

See also

NXT United Kingdom Championship

Notes

References

External links

WWE European Championship history at WWE.com

WWE championships
Continental professional wrestling championships